Well-Done is a collaborative studio album by American rapper Action Bronson and producer Statik Selektah. The project was supposed to be released two weeks before Selektah's album Population Control (released on 25 October 2011). However, it was released on November 22, by Switchblade Records and DCide Records. The album features guest appearances by Lil' Fame, AG da Coroner, Nina Sky, Meyhem Lauren, and Maffew Ragazino.

Track listing
All songs produced by Statik Selektah

Notes
 "Respect the Mustache" features uncredited vocals by Big Body Bes

References

2011 albums
Action Bronson albums
Statik Selektah albums
Albums produced by Statik Selektah
Collaborative albums